Paradoliops cabigasi is a species of beetle in the family Cerambycidae. It was described by Vives in 2009.

References

Apomecynini
Beetles described in 2009